The Vermont Agency of Education is the state education agency of Vermont. It is headquartered in the National Life building in Montpelier.

In 2018, Daniel M. French, Ed.D, was named Secretary of Education and he continues to lead in that capacity as of 2022.

References

External links
 Official website

Public education in Vermont
State departments of education of the United States
Education